Nanjing railway station is a major railway station of Nanjing, the capital of Jiangsu province. It is located in the northern part of Nanjing's urban core (just a short walk from the city wall), near Xuanwu Lake.

Services
Until 2010, this was the main railway station of Nanjing, with the great majority of all trains serving Nanjing using this station. Only a  small number of trains, going to the destinations to the southwest of Nanjing, pass through the (old) Nanjing South railway station, which is located south of Nanjing's walled city; service to Nanjing West railway station has been suspended.

After the opening of new Nanjing South railway station in the southern part of greater Nanjing in mid-2010, many of the high-speed trains serving Nanjing have been re-routed to that new station. However, Nanjing station has frequent high-speed service to Shanghai and Shanghai Hongqiao, some services also stopping at Zhenjiang, Changzhou and Suzhou. Some overnight D trains continue on north towards Beijing South railway station, Tianjin West railway station, or Xi'an North railway station.

Nanjing railway station is served by a station of the same name on Line 1 and Line 3 of Nanjing Metro. It is also the terminal for many of the city bus lines.

History
The station opened in September 1968, shortly before the opening of the Nanjing Yangtze River Bridge. The interchange with Nanjing Metro Line 3 opened on 1 April 2015 with the opening of that line.

On 30 September 2016 the metro station served a peak volume of 99,800 passengers.

See also
Zhonghuamen railway station (Nanjing)
Nanjing South railway station
Nanjing West railway station
Nanjing North railway station

References

External links

Nanjing Railway Station
Nanjing Railway Station Timetable

Railway stations in Nanjing
Stations on the Beijing–Shanghai Railway
Stations on the Shanghai–Nanjing Intercity Railway
Stations on the Shanghai–Wuhan–Chengdu high-speed railway
Nanjing Metro stations
Railway stations in China opened in 1968